The Weird Circle was a syndicated radio drama series produced in New York and originally broadcast between 1943 and 1945.

Production background 
The series was a Ziv Production, produced at RCA's New York studios and licensed by the Mutual Broadcasting System, and later, NBC's Red network. It lasted two seasons, 39 shows each (78 total) consisting mostly of radio adaptations of classic horror stories from the pens of the world's best known and respected supernatural fiction authors such as Edgar Allan Poe, Robert Louis Stevenson and Charles Dickens. The production values were modest and it featured very little music.

Series opening/closing

Standard opening 
(SFX: Running water, perhaps a sea surf. Bell tolls)

Old Man: "In this cave by the restless sea, we are met to call from out of the past, stories strange and weird. Bell keeper, toll the bell, so that all may know that we are gathered again in The Weird Circle."

Alternate opening 

Announcer: "Out of the past, phantoms from a world gone by speak again the immortal tale (episode title)."

Standard closing 
Host: "From the time worn pages of the past, we have recalled, (episode title). Bell Keeper, toll the bell!

(SFX: Bell tolls)

References

External links
 Weird Circle Titles, Authors, First Broadcast Dates
 Listen to episodes of The Weird Circle on mp3 at the Internet Archive

American radio dramas
Fantasy radio programs
Horror fiction radio programmes
Ziv Company radio programs
1940s American radio programs
Syndicated radio programs
Anthology radio series